The 1995–96 Segunda División season saw 20 teams participate in the second flight Spanish league. Hércules CF, CD Logroñés and CF Extremadura were promoted to Primera División. Sestao, Athletic de Bilbao B, Getafe CF and Atlético Marbella were relegated to Segunda División B.

From this season, wins worth 3 points instead of 2.

Teams

Teams by Autonomous Community

Final table

Results

Promotion playoff

First Leg

Second Leg 

Segunda División seasons
2
Spain